The women's hammer throw event at the 2011 World Championships in Athletics was held at the Daegu Stadium on September 2 and 4.

Betty Heidler was the pre-event favourite: she was undefeated that season, held the four best marks of the year, and had broken the world record with a throw of 79.42 m in May. Tatyana Lysenko, a former record holder, was ranked second prior to the championships. Yipsi Moreno and Zhang Wenxiu (both medalists at the 2008 Olympics) were both in good form that season, as was Kathrin Klaas (fourth in 2009). Zalina Marghieva, Alena Matoshka, Jennifer Dahlgren were other entrants ranked in the top ten. The 2009 world champion Anita Włodarczyk was not expected to compete due to a back injury.

Tatyana Lysenko won the competition on her first throw, then proceeded to improve her position on the next two throws.  Top qualifier Zhang Wenxiu also made her best throw on her first attempt.  It took Betty Heidler until the 5th round to finally displace her into bronze position, pushing Yipsi Moreno off the medal stand.  Defending champion Anita Włodarczyk did make a game effort, throwing her season best, but only managed 5th place.

Medalists

Records

Qualification standards

Schedule

Results

Qualification
Qualification: Qualifying Performance 71.00 (Q) or at least 12 best performers (q) advance to the final.

Final

References

External links
Hammer throw results at IAAF website

Hammer throw
Hammer throw at the World Athletics Championships
2011 in women's athletics